Luis Garisto Pan (3 December 1945 – 21 November 2017) was a Uruguayan football (soccer) coach who had a professional career as both player and head coach.

Career
Luis Garisto, el Loco, began his professional career in 1960 with Uruguayan club Defensor, known today as Defensor Sporting, and he was then transferred to Club Independiente of Argentina in Buenos Aires. He played there for several years, participating in all 5 consecutive championships with his club, 3 Libertadores cups, and 2 world club championships. Subsequently he was transferred to Peñarol of Montevideo, Uruguay. As a Captain of this squad, he obtained 2 championships. He was later signed by Club Cobreloa in Chile. With this club he won the B and A division consecutively and several other international cups such as Libertadores de America Cup and the Intercontinental Cup.

In 1973, he signed with the Chilean club Cobreloa and played for the Uruguayan Squad in the World Cup in Germany in 1974.

In 1974, Garisto punched Australian international Ray Baartz in the throat and jaw during a friendly fixture at the Sydney Cricket Ground, prematurely ending Baartz's playing career only months before Australia were to play in their first ever World Cup.

As a coach, he worked in several clubs such as Peñarol, Chacarita Juniors, Banfield, Argentinos Juniors, Estudiantes de la Plata, Cobreloa, Club Atlas and Deportivo Toluca F.C. Garisto coached Central Espanol in Uruguay.

He died on November 21, 2017 at the age of 71.

References

External links
Profile at MedioTiempo

1945 births
2017 deaths
Footballers from Montevideo
Uruguayan footballers
Uruguay international footballers
1974 FIFA World Cup players
Peñarol players
Cobreloa footballers
Club Atlético Independiente footballers
Uruguayan Primera División players
Argentine Primera División players
Expatriate footballers in Argentina
Expatriate footballers in Chile
Expatriate football managers in Chile
Uruguayan expatriate footballers
Uruguayan expatriate sportspeople in Chile
Uruguayan football managers
Argentinos Juniors managers
Club Atlético Banfield managers
Cobreloa managers
Chacarita Juniors managers
Estudiantes de La Plata managers
Club de Gimnasia y Esgrima La Plata managers
Peñarol managers
Atlas F.C. managers
Deportivo Toluca F.C. managers
Association football defenders
Rampla Juniors managers
Danubio F.C. managers
Unión de Santa Fe managers
Montevideo Wanderers managers